Hiam Amani is an American-born beauty queen and founder of Miss Bangladesh USA. She founded Miss Bangladesh US at the age of eighteen and later became a national director for Asia's oldest and largest beauty pageant— Miss Asia Pacific International at the age of nineteen.

Pageants

Miss Bangladesh US 
While in her first semester of her freshman year of college, Hafizuddin founded the Miss Bangladesh US pageant.

She was inspired by the essence of pageantry—inspiring feminine empowerment and advocating for social justice. At the time, Bangladesh not having any pageants in place for women of that background, she decided to become the pioneer of pageantry for this demographic by creating Miss Bangladesh USA which later became renamed Miss Bangladesh US.

Miss Asia Pacific International
Hiam is the official National Director of Bangladesh for Miss Asia Pacific International.

America's Miss World 2016 

In July 2016, Hiam competed in the Miss World America competition. She gained significant international media recognition leading up to the competition for being the first woman of Bangladeshi descent to be competing in the pageant. Following, she contributed to the reinstatement of Miss World Bangladesh to allow women of Bangladesh to participate in the international pageant: Miss World for the first time in seventeen years.

Hiam was featured on various international media platforms for her involvement in promoting her Beauty with a Purpose project: Unity through Diversity. Her video was featured on NBC News and NBC Asian America honoring her dedication to promote inclusivity and recognition for Asian America people.

References 

American beauty pageant contestants
Living people
People from Illinois
1995 births